Amart may refer to:
 Amart Sports, an Australian sporting goods store by Super Retail Group Ltd.
 A.mart, a Taiwanese hypermarket chain